Crown Prince Sunhoe (Hangul: 순회세자, Hanja: 順懷世子; 1 July 1551 – 6 October 1563), born Yi Bu, or Lee Bu was crown prince of Joseon Dynasty and the only son of Myeongjong of Joseon and Queen Insun.

Biography
In 1557, Yi Bu at 7 years old was chosen to be a Crown Prince and later, in 1561 (16th year reign of his father), Yun-Ok (윤옥)'s daughter was chosen as Crown Princess (왕세자빈).

On 29 September in the same year, his father, King Myeongjong even ordered a major pardon when a circuit prince fell ill. However, he died not long after that only at 12 years old. His tomb then located in Sunchangwon in Seooreung 334-32, Seooreung-ro, Deogyang-gu, Goyang-si, Gyeonggi-do, South Korea and was buried along with his wife, Crown Princess Yun, but her body was unknown during the Imjin War Periods.

Family
Father: King Myeongjong of Joseon (3 July 1532 - 2 August 1567) (조선 명종)
Grandfather: King Jungjong of Joseon (16 April 1488 - 29 November 1544) (조선 중종)
Grandmother: Queen Munjeong of the Papyeong Yun clan (2 December 1501 – 5 May 1565) (문정왕후 윤씨)
Mother: Queen Insun of the Cheongseong Sim clan (7 June 1532 - 12 February 1575) (인순왕후 심씨)
Grandfather: Sim-Gang, Internal Prince Cheongreung (1514 - 1567) (심강 청릉부원군, 沈鋼 靑陵府院君)
Grandmother: Internal Princess Consort Wansan of the Jeonju Yi clan (1512 - 1559) (완산부부인 이씨)
 Consorts: 
Crown Princess Gonghoe of the Musong Yun clan (1552 - 3 March 1592) (공회빈 윤씨) — No issue.
Consort Yang-Je of the Changwon Hwang clan (양제 황씨) — No issue.

References

External links
Crown Prince Sunhoe on Sillok .
Crown Prince Sunhoe on Encykorea .
Crown Prince Sunhoe on Naver .

1551 births
1563 deaths
16th-century Korean monarchs
House of Yi
Korean princes
Royalty who died as children
Heirs apparent who never acceded